Nick Apollo Forte (born Nicola Antonio Forte; June 14, 1938 – February 26, 2020) was an American musician and actor.

Early life 
Forte was born in Waterbury, Connecticut. At age 12, he won a local talent contest playing "Lady of Spain" on piano. At 18, he got his first break playing second billing to Della Reese at the famed Apollo Theatre; this led him to change his performing name to "Nick Apollo Forte" and drop out of high school to pursue a music career.

After many years of Forte singing in lounges and producing and distributing his own records, a casting agent for Woody Allen discovered one of Forte's albums, Images, in a record store on Broadway. Allen cast the singer as Lou Canova in his 1984 film Broadway Danny Rose. For his work, he received positive reviews. Forte also appeared on Johnny Carson's Tonight Show on February 16, 1984.

Career 
Forte was cast in a TV pilot, Mr. Success, in which he played a "loveable shlump" who worked in a department store. Although the show was tailor-made for Forte, the program was beset by problems, and he was replaced by James Coco. (The pilot aired on CBS on June 23, 1984, but did not sell.) Forte returned to working lounges, but made a few screen appearances in subsequent years: a guest spot on The Ellen Burstyn Show in 1987 and the Showtime series Billions in 2016—both times (as in Broadway Danny Rose) basically playing himself.

Forte spent most of his time with his family and fishing. He sang his famous songs and played music, and was known to sing sea shanties as well while dancing the jig. He was well known for his radio commercials for Goodyear Tires.

Family 
In 1958, he married Rosalie Trapasso, who worked at a shoe store he managed.  They were married over 60 years and had seven children and 22 grandchildren.

References

External links
Official site

 

1938 births
Actors from Waterbury, Connecticut
American male film actors
Place of death missing
American people of Italian descent
2020 deaths